was a Japanese social reformer, educator, radio and TV personality, and politician from Wakayama city, Wakayama Prefecture. One of the leaders of the Boy Scouts' early days in Japan and the first to be elected mayor of Takatsuki, Osaka, he served as the director of the Scout Association of Japan, as well as executive director of the Japan Camping Federation.

Background
In 1979 he received the highest distinction of the Scout Association of Japan, the Golden Pheasant Award.

References

External links 

Scouting in Japan
Scouting pioneers
1897 births
1992 deaths
Mayors of places in Osaka Prefecture
People from Wakayama (city)